Liabygda is a village in Stranda Municipality in Møre og Romsdal county, Norway.  The village is located on the northern shore of the Norddalsfjorden, just north of the mouth of the Sunnylvsfjorden.  Liabygda and its immediate vicinity are separated from the rest of the municipality by the fjord.  There is a ferry from Liabygda at Gravaneset to the village of Stranda on the south side of the Storfjorden.  Liabygda Church is located in this village, serving the part of Stranda on the eastern side of the fjord.

References

Villages in Møre og Romsdal
Stranda